I'm the Man is the second EP by American metal band Anthrax, released in 1987 by Megaforce Worldwide/Island Records (although the song was supposedly written three years before). The band, along with Eddie Kramer and Paul Hammingson, produced the EP, which includes the single "I'm the Man". The single is considered among the first rap metal songs.

The title track is a comedy/novelty song that parodies the style of the Beastie Boys, and its main guitar riff is based on the melody of the Jewish folk song "Hava Nagila" (guitarists Scott Ian and Dan Spitz, as well as all the members of the Beastie Boys, are Jewish). 

For live performances, Joey Belladonna and Charlie Benante would switch places, Benante performing some of the raps and Belladonna drumming. A 7" single was also released, containing only the second and fifth tracks.

Samples and borrowed material
The beginning of "I'm the Man" features an electric guitar riff of the Jewish folk song "Hava Nagila", which can also be heard in the chorus. The chorus' lyrics are borrowed from one of Taylor Negron's lines in the Rodney Dangerfield film Easy Money. Rather than using a sample, the song's lines are performed by Frank Bello. Anthrax also used one of Sam Kinison's famous primal screams for the song. At about 1:55, a sample of the Metallica song "Master of Puppets" from the 1986 album Master of Puppets can be heard. A few times after "I'm The Man" is said, a sample of "shut up" from Run-DMC's "You Talk Too Much" from the 1985 album King of Rock can be heard. Additionally, the "yeah" that begins the song "(You Gotta) Fight for Your Right (To Party!)" by the Beastie Boys on their 1986 debut, Licensed to Ill, is sampled.

Track listing

Personnel
Joey Belladonna – lead vocals, drums
Frank Bello – bass guitar, vocals
Charlie Benante – drums, vocals
Scott Ian – rhythm guitar, vocals
Dan Spitz – lead guitar, rhythm guitar

Additional personnel
Mark Weiss – photographer, album photography

Charts

EP

Song

Certifications

References

1987 EPs
Comedy songs
Anthrax (American band) EPs
Island Records EPs
Albums produced by Eddie Kramer
Rap metal EPs